Moçarria is a parish in the municipality of Santarém, Portugal, with  of area and 1072 inhabitants (2001).

Situated on a hill in the area called the "Neighborhood" from Santarém near the municipality of Rio Maior by the west, the parish of Moçarria distances  from town. Historian  believes that the toponym Moçarria is of Arab origin or Mozarabic (musta'rib or muzarra) which means Joy.

Freguesias of Santarém, Portugal